Warren Wayne Whitlinger (April 4, 1914 – April 30, 2012) was an American professional basketball player. He played in the National Basketball League for the Akron Firestone Non-Skids during the 1937–38 season and averaged 4.5 points per game. As a senior at Ohio State in 1935–36, Whitlinger led the Big Ten Conference in scoring and was named to the All-Big Ten team. He also earned his Master of Business Administration (MBA) from Ohio State, graduating in 1940, and then accepted a job to work for Kimberly-Clark Corporation.

Family and tennis connections
In the early 1960s Whitlinger became involved with tennis. It became his new passion and he got into coaching, where he ended up training three different national champions within his own family – his son John and his twin granddaughters Tami and Teri. All three went on to have professional tennis careers, and John served as Stanford's men's tennis head coach from 2005 to 2014.

The Whitlingers were recognized as the Wisconsin and Midwest Tennis Family of the Year in 1986 and the USTA National Tennis Family of the Year in 1987. Warren was inducted into the Fox Valley Tennis Association Hall of Fame in 1999.

References

1914 births
2012 deaths
Akron Firestone Non-Skids players
American men's basketball players
Basketball players from Ohio
Forwards (basketball)
Ohio State Buckeyes men's basketball players
People from Barnesville, Ohio
Sportspeople from Neenah, Wisconsin
Tennis people from Ohio